Vladimir Anatolyevich Ivanov is a Russian professional Grand Prix motorcycle racer. In 2010 and 2011 he raced under a Ukrainian racing license. In 2013 he raced in the Supersport World Championship for Kawasaki DMC-Lorenzini Team.

Career statistics

Supersport World Championship

By season

Grand Prix racing

By season

Races by year
(key)

References

External links

Living people
1983 births
Sportspeople from Saint Petersburg
Russian motorcycle racers
Ukrainian motorcycle racers
Moto2 World Championship riders
Supersport World Championship riders